Melody Falcó Díaz (born 18 July 1975) is a Mexican former professional tennis player.

Falcó, who won seven ITF doubles titles, represented Mexico at the 1998 Central American and Caribbean Games in Maracaibo, where she earned two silver medals. She played collegiate tennis for the University of Texas.

Between 1998 and 2000 she was a member of the Mexico Fed Cup team. In her debut year she featured primarily in doubles, winning all six of her matches partnering Paola Palencia. She didn't play for Mexico in 1999, then in 2000 returned to the side and appeared in the first singles rubber in each of her four ties, which included a win over Colombia's Catalina Castaño. Her doubles partners in 2000 were Jessica Fernández and Erika Valdés.

ITF finals

Doubles: 9 (7–2)

References

External links
 
 
 

1975 births
Living people
Mexican female tennis players
Texas Longhorns women's tennis players
Tennis players from Mexico City
Competitors at the 1998 Central American and Caribbean Games
Central American and Caribbean Games medalists in tennis
Central American and Caribbean Games silver medalists for Mexico
20th-century Mexican women